Up the Creek is a 1984 comedy film directed by Robert Butler and starring Tim Matheson, Dan Monahan, Stephen Furst, Jeff East, Sandy Helberg, Blaine Novak, James B. Sikking, Jennifer Runyon, and John Hillerman.

Plot summary
Bob McGraw, Max, Gonzer, and Irwin, students at Lepetomane University (known derisively by some as "Lobotomy U"), are volunteered to compete in a collegiate raft race. They are "recruited" by Dean Burch who uses records of McGraw's checkered past as a means of blackmail to get them to compete. He offers them degrees in the major of their choice as additional incentive. "You have the distinct honor of being the four worst students in the entire country.", says Birch, "You're not AT the bottom of the list, you ARE the bottom of the list!"  Their opponents include Ivy University, prep schoolers who, with the help of an Ivy alumnus named Dr. Roland Tozer, plan to cheat their way to the Winner's Circle. Their adversaries also include the Washington Military Institute, who are soon disqualified for their attempts to sabotage the other schools' rafts. Captain Braverman, the leader of the Military men, seeks revenge on McGraw for hindering their attempts to sabotage the other rafts. Also entered is a team of attractive female students, one of whom ends up in a romantic situation with McGraw.

Cast
 Tim Matheson ... Bob McGraw
 Dan Monahan ... Max
 Sandy Helberg ... Irwin
 Stephen Furst ... Gonzer
 Jennifer Runyon ... Heather Merriweather
 Jeff East ... Rex Crandall
 James Sikking ... Tozer (as James B. Sikking)
 Blaine Novak ... Captain Braverman
 Mark Andrews ... Rocky
 Jesse D. Goins ... Brown
 Julia Montgomery ... Lisa (as Julie Montgomery)
 Romy Windsor ... Corky 
 John Hillerman ... Dean Burch
 Grant Wilson ... Reggie
 Jeana Tomasino ... Molly
 Will Bledsoe ... Roger van Dyke
 Robert Costanzo ... Campus Guard Charlie
 Ken Gibbel ... Campus Guard Leslie
 Hap Lawrence ... Gas Station Attendant
 Frank Welker as the voice of Chuck the Dog

Production notes
This film was filmed in Bend, Oregon.

Writer Jim Kouf later said Robert Butler "was not a great comedy director, he missed a lot of jokes."

Soundtrack

 "Up the Creek" – Cheap Trick
 "The Heat" – Heart
 "30 Days in the Hole" – Kick Axe
 "Great Expectations (You Never Know What to Expect)" – Ian Hunter
 "Chasin' the Sky" – The Beach Boys
 "Get Ready Boy" – Shooting Star
 "One Track Heart (Passion in the Dark)" – Danny Spanos
 "Take It" – Shooting Star
 "Two Hearts on the Loose Tonight" – Randy Bishop
 "Get Ready Boy (Instrumental)" – Shooting Star

One song that was in the film but not on the soundtrack is "First Girl President" by Namrac.

Reception
The Los Angeles Times wrote that the film was "not as consistently amusing" as Police Academy but was "rambunctious and raunchy enough to divert undemanding audiences." The Washington Post called it "a moist smut movie" in which the best performance was given by the dog. The New York Times called it "a ridiculous ordeal, all right, but certainly not in the way the filmmakers intended." Gene Siskel of the Chicago Tribune however said the film was "a good time", where Matheson, Furst and Helberg "play their roles with the same whimsical naturalness that made Bill Murray a star. They don't push themselves upon us, and that allows us to identify with them in a relaxed way. The result is a very tight script with breathing room. That's most unusual for a teen comedy, and that's why Up the Creek is one of the best."

References

External links
 Up the Creek review at the New York Times
Review of film by Roger Ebert
 
 
 

1984 films
1980s sex comedy films
American sex comedy films
American independent films
1980s English-language films
Films shot in Bend, Oregon
Orion Pictures films
Rafting films
Films directed by Robert Butler
Teen sex comedy films
Teensploitation
Films set on boats
1984 comedy films
1984 independent films
1980s American films